James Bradley  (born 1967) is an Australian novelist and critic. Born in Adelaide, South Australia, he trained as a lawyer before becoming a writer.

Bradley's novels, which have been published internationally, explore both past and future. His books include seven novels and a book of poetry. He has also edited two anthologies, Blur, a collection of writing by young Australian writers, and The Penguin Book of the Ocean. Bradley also writes as a critic, with reviews and articles appearing regularly in Australian newspapers and magazines, and blogs at City of Tongues.

In 2012 he won the Pascall Prize for Criticism and was named Australian Critic of the Year.

He lives in Sydney with his partner, the novelist Mardi McConnochie.

Bibliography

Bradley's novels explore both past and future. The first, Wrack explores questions about the nature of history and the imaginary origins of Australia, drawing together the story of the semi-mythical "Mahogany Ship", a Portuguese caravel supposedly wrecked on the southern coast of Australia, love stories and a murder-mystery.

The second, The Deep Field, is set in a dystopic near-future and tells the story of a 'love affair' between a photographer and a blind palaeontologist. The third, The Resurrectionist, based loosely on the story of the Burke and Hare murders details the fall from grace of a young anatomist, Gabriel Swift. And the fourth, Clade, uses the story of three generations of a family to explore the possible effects of climate change over the 21st century.

Bradley's seventh novel, Ghost Species, was published on 27 April 2020.

Novels
Wrack (1997) 
The Deep Field (1999) 
The Resurrectionist (2006) 
Clade (2015) 
The Silent Invasion (2017) 
The Buried Ark (2018) 
Ghost Species (2020)

Novellas
Beauty's Sister (2013)

Poetry
Paper Nautilus (1994)

Editor
Blur: Stories by Young Australian Writers (1996)
The Penguin Book of the Ocean (2010)

Awards and recognition
His novels have won or been shortlisted for a number of major Australian literary awards, including The Age Fiction Book of the Year, the Miles Franklin Literary Award, the New South Wales Premier's Literary Awards, the Commonwealth Writers Prize for Best First Book (SE Asia and Pacific Region), the Courier-Mail Book of the Year Award, the Aurealis Best Novel Award (Science Fiction category), the Adelaide Festival's National Fiction Award, the Fellowship of the Australian Writers Literature Award, the Australian National Book Council's 'Banjo' Award and the Kathleen Mitchell Literary Award. He was also one of The Sydney Morning Herald's Best Young Australian Novelists in 1997 and 2000, and on 16 June 2008 The Resurrectionist was included as one of Richard & Judy's Summer Reads for 2008. In 2012 he won the Pascall Prize for Criticism and was named Australian Critic of the Year.

Bradley was awarded the Medal of the Order of Australia for "service to literature as a writer" in the 2021 Queen's Birthday Honours.

References

External links
Bradley's website
Q&A with Bradley about Clade
Read an extract from Clade
James Bradley: Anatomy of Violence, The Sydney Morning Herald, 4 March 2006

1967 births
Living people
Writers from Adelaide
Australian literary critics
Australian male novelists
Adelaide Law School alumni
Recipients of the Medal of the Order of Australia
20th-century Australian novelists
21st-century Australian novelists
20th-century Australian male writers
21st-century Australian male writers